Indian Space Association (ISpA) is an industry association for Indian space and satellite manufacturing companies.ISpA (Indian Space Industry Association) is a voluntary association of leading space industries in India. It was established with the objective of providing advisory and advocacy support to the space industry in India. The primary function of ISpA is to articulate the views of the industry on space sector reforms and provide guidance for a vibrant and thriving space industry in India.

The association serves as a platform for its members to come together and engage in discussions and initiatives that promote the growth of the Indian space industry. As an advisory body, ISpA provides valuable inputs to the Indian government on various policy matters related to the space sector.

The association's membership includes major players in the Indian space industry, including private companies, research institutions, and academic institutions. By bringing together the collective expertise of its members, ISpA aims to drive innovation and excellence in the Indian space industry.

ISpA also works towards promoting collaboration between the Indian space industry and international players, thereby enabling the industry to leverage global best practices and technologies. Through its initiatives, ISpA aims to position India as a leading space industry association in the global space ecosystem.

History 
On October 11, 2021, Prime Minister of India Narendra Modi launched the Indian Space Association as a “single-window” agency for facilitating space sector business opportunities for Indian start-ups and the private sector.

Members 
The list of ISpA members are divided in five categories; founding members,core members, associate members, start-up members and other members. It is listed below in alphabetical order;

Founding members 

 Alpha Design Technologies
 Bharti Airtel
 Larsen & Toubro
 MapmyIndia
 Nelco (Tata Group)
 OneWeb India Communications
 Walchandnagar Industries

Core members 

 Ananth Technologies
 Astra Microwave Products
 Azista-BST Aerospace
 Bharat Forge
 Centum Electronics
 Godrej Group
 Hughes India
 Maxar India

Associate members 

 Avantel
 BAE Systems India
 Bharat Electronics
 Broadcast Engineering Consultants India
 Inmarsat India
 Planet Labs
 Rasu Tools
Siddhartha Logistics

Start-up members 

 Agnikul Cosmos
 Aidin Technologies 
 Altz Technologies
 Astrome Technologies 
 Bellatrix Aerospace
 BES Space
 CYRAN AI Solutions 
 Dhruva Space
 Digantara 
 Dron Vayu 
 Elena Geo Systems 
 Enabletech Industries 
 GalaxEye Space 
 SkyServe
 Indian Technology Congress Association
 Kawa Space
 Kepler Aerospace 
 Manastu Space Technologies 
 Micronet Solutions
 Numer8 Analytics 
 Pixxel
 Robinsons Cargo & Logistics
 Saankhya Labs 
 SISIR Radar 
 Skyroot Aerospace
 Space Machines Company
 Suhora Technologies 
 Sunrise Ventures
 TSC Technologies 
 Xovian Aerospace

Other members 

 Space Kidz India

References 

Trade associations based in India
Organizations established in 2021
Chambers of commerce in India